Samuel Steinfeld (February 15, 1906 in Louisville, Kentucky – November 22, 2007) was the Chief Justice of the Supreme Court of Kentucky. He was elected to the Kentucky Court of Appeals in 1966 and became chief justice in 1972; when the Kentucky courts were reformed in 1975, he became the first chief justice of the newly formed state Supreme Court.

References

Chief Justices of the Kentucky Supreme Court
20th-century American lawyers
20th-century American Jews
Politicians from Louisville, Kentucky
University of Louisville alumni
1906 births
2007 deaths
American centenarians
Men centenarians
20th-century American judges
21st-century American Jews